Tom Glassic is a former guard in the National Football League (NFL) for the Denver Broncos.

He attended Watchung Hills Regional High School in Warren, New Jersey.

References

1954 births
Living people
American football offensive guards
Denver Broncos players
Sportspeople from Elizabeth, New Jersey
Virginia Cavaliers football players
Players of American football from New Jersey
Watchung Hills Regional High School alumni